The Copa Libertadores 1971 was the 12th edition of the Copa Libertadores, CONMEBOL's annual international club tournament. Nacional won the competition.

The participating teams were divided into five groups, in which teams of the same country were placed in the same group. Each country was represented by two teams. The countries were paired as follows:

Group 1:  Peru and  Argentina
Group 2:  Bolivia and  Uruguay*
Group 3:  Brazil and  Venezuela
Group 4:  Chile and  Paraguay
Group 5:  Colombia and  Ecuador

First phase

Group 1

Group 2

Group 3

Group 4

Group 5

Second phase

Group 1

Group 2

Finals

Replay match at Estadio Nacional (Lima, Peru)

Champion

External links
Match results at CONMEBOL's website (In Spanish)
In English
Match result at RSSSF's website

1
Copa Libertadores seasons